I Due derelitti is a 1951 Italian melodrama film directed by Flavio Calzavara.

Plot 
Count George of Kerlor, convinced that his wife has betrayed him and that little Gianni, the boy he raised as a son, is not in reality his own, entrusts the poor boy to a criminal nicknamed Snail, who already has a boy, Claudinet. Gianni is renamed Fanfan and, growing up with Claudinet, the two boys become inseparable.

Cast
Massimo Serato as Ramon 
Yves Deniaud as Lumaca
Lea Padovani as Elena 
Marie Bizet as Lumaca's wife 
Enzo Cerusico

References

External links
 

1951 films
Italian drama films
1950s Italian-language films
Films directed by Flavio Calzavara
1951 drama films
Melodrama films
Italian black-and-white films
1950s Italian films